The 1941 UC Santa Barbara Gauchos football team was an American football team that represented Santa Barbara State  College (now known as the University of California, Santa Barbara) as a member of the California Collegiate Athletic Association (CCAA) during the 1941 college football season. In their first year under head coach Stan Williamson, the Gauchos compiled a 3–5–1 record (1–2 against CCAA opponents). The team played its home games at La Playa Stadium in Santa Barbara, California.

Halfback/fullback Ernie Saenz was the team captain. Other key players included halfbacks Owen Van Buskirk and Hovis Bess, quarterback George James, fullback/guard Paul Siano, and centers Walt Ahlgren and Frankie Jones.

A tenth game, scheduled for October 18 against the University of California Ramblers, was cancelled after the team physician found that nine of Santa Barbara's 24 players were unfit to play.

Due to World War II, this was the last year of competition for Santa Barbara until 1946.

Schedule

Notes

References

Santa Barbara State
UC Santa Barbara Gauchos football seasons
Santa Barbara State Gauchos football